"Mork Goes Erk" is the seventeenth episode of the first season of Mork & Mindy.  The episode first premiered on ABC on February 8, 1979.  "Mork Goes Erk" was later released on VHS on January 1, 1998 as part of a two-episode special which also included "Mork's First Christmas," and on DVD on September 7, 2004 as part of the "Mork & Mindy - The Complete First Season" DVD boxed set.

In the episode, David Letterman portrayed a self-help group leader by the name of "Ellsworth" offering ERK or Ellsworth Revitalization Konditioning. Mork (Robin Williams) and Mindy (Pam Dawber) attend one of Ellsworth's trainings at the suggestion of their friend Susan (Morgan Fairchild), where they endure Ellsworth's authoritarian brand of group therapy.  Mork points out hypocrisy in Ellsworth's teachings, and exposes him as a fraud.  The episode has been called a parody of the Erhard Seminars Training or "est" course.  The episode received mostly positive reviews, and was highlighted as one of the season's best episodes, along with "Mork's First Christmas" and "Mork's Mixed Emotions".  David Letterman's performance as "Ellsworth" also received good reviews.

Plot 
At the beginning of the episode, Mork, Mindy and Bickley (Tom Poston) are all sitting around feeling depressed.  Mindy has just learned that Mork's supervisor Orson has arranged for Mork to be transferred to another planet, and Bickley is suffering from writer's block.  Their friend Susan comes by to visit, and suggests that they all go and attend a seminar on Ellsworth's Revitalization Konditioning.  As the guests arrive at the seminar, Ellsworth nervously asks Susan if all of the attendees' checks are in order.  He then lays out the rules for the duration of the training, which includes no leaving and no consumption of alcohol.  When Bickley hears this, he promptly gets up to leave the seminar.

The attendants of the seminar are then given Ellsworth's harsh version of reality, which has been compared to the tenets of Erhard Seminars Training.  Ellsworth preaches a belief in self-adoration, which he says will get rid of emotional highs and lows.  Ellsworth centers this goal around the notion of "finding our own space."  He utilizes an authoritarian style of control within the group, as a therapeutic method to solve problems.  The other attendees at the seminar are shown to be passive consumers looking for any way to fix their personal issues.  However, Mork, with his trademark causing of difficulty, begins to question the foundation of the rules of the course, as well as the nature of the philosophical material that Ellsworth has put forth, by pointing out hypocrisy among Ellsworth's own contradictory statements.  In the end, Mork wins out over the Ellsworth philosophy by instead calling to mind universal humanistic moral values.  Ellsworth dismisses Mork's victory over his methodology, exclaiming: "I've got my Rolls-Royce!" Mork wins a moral victory-and Ellworth, it turns out, has had his Rolls-Royce stolen.

Cultural references 

In a 1982 article in the journal Theory & Society, Lewis & Clark College sociology professor Robert Goldman compared and contrasted Letterman's "Ellsworth" character and his training program to that of Werner Erhard's course Erhard Seminars Training.  Goldman noted that the episode spent time: "lampooning Werner Erhard and est-like commercial pop psychologies."  However, Goldman went on to note that the inherent problem with "Ellsworth Revitalization Konditioning" was not the training - but Ellsworth himself.

Ellsworth is seen as a parody of consumerism: "As the self-help entrepreneur, Ellsworth is portrayed as a walking collection of lifestyle-status points and sign-values...Conspicuous consumption and commodity fetishism define his personality."  Goldman explained that the Mork and Mindy episode succeeded in distinguishing between criticism of the Ellsworth training, and criticism of Ellsworth, citing Ellsworth's character traits of: "tyranny, selfishness, open greed, and flaunting of the accoutrements of his vulgar money-making."

Reception 
TV Guide's 2005 book TV Guide: The Ultimate Resource to Television Programs on DVD highlighted "Mork Goes Erk" as one of three "Classic Episodes" of the first season, including "Mork's First Christmas", and "Mork's Mixed Emotions".  Matthew Tobey of Allmovie wrote that the episode was most notable because of David Letterman's appearance before he became more well known.  Donald Liebenson of Amazon.com also cited David Letterman's performance as: "an abusive EST-like guru" as one of the more memorable parts of the Season One DVD boxed set, but thought that the highlight of the season was the episode "Mork's Mixed Emotions."  The Dallas Morning News also praised Letterman's performance as a "shady motivational speaker," commenting that the episode was a way for Letterman to hone his "smarminess" before his later work on Late Show with David Letterman.  Jonathan Boudreaux of tvdvdreviews.com described Letterman as "a flakey EST-like guru," and called the episode itself "disjointed."

See also 

est and The Forum in popular culture
Human Potential Movement
Large Group Awareness Training
New age
Parody
Parody religion
Pseudophilosophy
Self-help

References

External links 
 

Mork and Mindy Online

Human Potential Movement
New Age in popular culture
Personal development
Parodies
1979 American television episodes
Werner Erhard